The Scots Trad Music Awards or Na Trads were founded in 2003 by Simon Thoumire to celebrate Scotland's traditional music in all its forms and create a high profile opportunity to bring the music and music industry into the spotlight of media and public attention. Nominations are made by the public and in 2019 over 100,000 public votes were expected across 18 categories.

The awards are organised by Thoumire's organisation Hands Up for Trad. Since 2008 the awards have been sponsored by MG Alba, and the event is televised on BBC Alba.

Since 2019 the ceremony has including the awarding of The Belhaven Bursary for Innovation in Scottish Music, sponsored by Belhaven Brewery. The prize consists of £25,000, an ale brewed with the winner's name on it, an appearance at an event at Tartan Week in New York and the use of the winner's music in an advertising campaign. The cash prize is the largest music prize in Scotland, matched only by the Mercury Prize.

Award winners

2022
The ceremony was held at the Caird Hall in Dundee
Event of the Year: Hebcelt Festival (Lewis)
Album of The Year: For The Night by Elephant Sessions
Citty Finlayson Scots Singer of the Year: Beth Malcolm
Club of The Year: Aberdeen Folk Club
Community Music Project of the Year: Isle of Arran Music School
Composer of the Year: Rachel Newton, Lauren MacColl (Heal & Harrow)
Gaelic Singer of the Year: Ruairidh Gray
Lighting Designer of the Year: Greig Shankland
Live Act of the Year: Skerryvore
Live Sound Engineer of the Year: Scott Turnbull
Music Producer of the Year: Anna Massie
Music Tutor of the Year: Charlie Mckerron
Musician of the Year: Megan Henderson
Original Work of the Year: Talamh Beò – Living Land, commissioned by Coigach & Assynt Living Landscape Partnership Scheme
Recording Studio of the Year: GloWorm Recording (Glasgow)
Scottish Dance Band of the Year: Alan Crookston Band
Scottish Folk Band of the Year: Breabach
Scottish Pipe Band of the Year: Inveraray and District Pipe Band
Services to Gaelic: Dr Anne Lorne Gillies
Studio Engineer of the Year: Keith Morrison (Wee Studio)
The Hamish Henderson Services to Traditional Music Awards: Caroline Maclennan from HebCelt Festival
The Janet Paisley Services to Scots Language: Anne Donovan
Trad Music in the Media: Heading West: a story about a band called Shooglenifty
Trad Video of the Year: She Moves Me by Kim Carnie
Up & Coming Artist of the Year: Valtos
Venue of the Year: Knoydart Community Hall

2021
The ceremony was held at the Engine Works in Glasgow

Original Work of the Year: 7 Years Old by Calum MacPhail
Community Project of the Year: Riddell Fiddles’ Two Towns Housing Estate Youth Musical Outreach Programme
Event of the Year: Celtic Connections
Gaelic Singer of the Year: Kim Carnie
Musician of the Year: Iona Fyfe
Online Performance of 2021: Norrie "Tago" MacIver Live Streams
Citty Finlayson Scots Singer of the Year: Ellie Beaton
Trad Video of the Year: Doddies Dream by Bruce MacGregor
Trad Music in the Media: Ceòl is Cràdh (Mental health in musicians’ documentary) on BBC Alba.
Up and Coming Artist of the Year: The Canny Band
Music Tutor of the Year: Craig Muirhead, Director of Piping and Drumming at Strathallan School
Album of the Year: Where the World Is Thin by Kris Drever

2020
The awards had been due to be staged in the Caird Hall Dundee, but were moved online due to the COVID-19 pandemic, and presented by Alistair Heather and Mary Ann Kennedy. The categories were also adapted for the circumstances.
 Album of The Year: The Woods by Hamish Napier
 Original Work of the Year: Everyday Heroes by Skerryvore
 Community Music Project of the Year: "Tunes in the Hoose"
 Event of the Year Award: BBC Radio Scotland Young Traditional Musician Award 20th Anniversary Concert (Celtic Connections)

 Gaelic Singer of the Year: Fionnag NicChoinnich (Fiona MacKenzie)
 Musician of the Year: Tim Edey
 Online Performance of 2020: Duncan Chisholm's Covid Ceilidh
 Citty Finlayson Scots Singer of the Year: Siobhan Miller
 Trad Video of the Year: Calum Dan's Transit Van by Peat & Diesel
 Trad Music in the Media: Anna Massie – Black Isle Correspondent
 Up & Coming artist of the Year: Rebecca Hill
 Music Tutor of the Year: Josie Duncan
 Janet Paisley Services to Scots Language Award: James Robertson
 Services to Gaelic Award: John Smith (BBC Television)
 Hamish Henderson Award for Services to Traditional Music: Lisa Whytock

2019
The awards were staged in Aberdeen
 Album of the Year: Frenzy of the Meeting by Breabach
 The Belhaven Bursary for Innovation in Scottish Music: Kinnaris Quintet
 Club of the Year: Sutherland Sessions
 Composer of the Year: Jenna Reid
 Community Project of the Year: SEALL Festival of Small Halls
 Event of the Year: Tiree Music Festival
 Gaelic Singer of the Year: Mary Ann Kennedy
 Musician of the Year: Jenn Butterworth
 Live Act of the Year: Peat and Diesel
 Citty Finlayson Scots Singer of the Year: Steve Byrne
 Scottish Dance Band of the Year: The Cruickshank Family Band
 Scottish Folk Band of the Year: Blazin' Fiddles
 Scottish Pipe Band of the Year: Inveraray & District Pipe Band
 Trad Video of the Year: Heroes by Tide Lines
 Music Tutor of the Year: Iain Ruari Finlayson, Skye Schools
 Up and Coming Artist of the Year: Man of the Minch
 Venue of the Year Award: An Tobar (Mull)
 The Hamish Henderson Services to Traditional Music Award: Dr. Peter Cooke
 Services to Gaelic: Anne Soutar
 The Janet Paisley Services to Scots Language: Sheena Blackhall

2018
The awards were staged in Perth and broadcast live on BBC Alba.
 Belhaven Bursary for Innovation in Scottish Music: Talisk
 Album of the Year :  Sandwood by Duncan Chisholm
 Club of the Year:  Partick Folk Club
 Composer of the Year:  Duncan Chisholm
 Community Project of the Year:  Care for a Ceilidh
 Event of the Year:  Far Far from Ypres
 Gaelic Singer of the Year:  Eilidh Cormack
 Instrumentalist of the Year: Calum Stewart
 Live Act of the Year:  Elephant Sessions
 Citty Finlayson Scots Singer of the Year: Iona Fyfe
 Scottish Dance Band of the Year:  Susan MacFadyen
 Scottish Folk Band of the Year: Dàimh
 Scottish Pipe Band of the Year: Inveraray & District Pipe Band
 Trad Music in the Media:  Pipeline, BBC Radio Scotland
 Music Tutor of the Year: Anna Wendy Stevenson
 Up and Coming Artist of the Year:  Assynt 
 Venue of the Year Award: Drygate Brewery, Glasgow
 Services to Gaelic: Runrig
 The Hamish Henderson Services to Traditional Music Award:  Pete Shepheard
 Services to Scots Language: Janet Paisley

2017
The awards were staged at Lagoon Centre, Paisley and broadcast live on BBC Alba.
 Album of the Year:  All We Have Is Now by Elephant Sessions
 Citty Finlayson Scots Singer of the Year:   Siobhan Miller
 Club of the Year: Edinburgh Folk Club
 Community Project of the Year: Tiree Songbook
 Composer of the Year:   Adam Sutherland
 Dance Band of the Year: Duncan Black Band
 Event of the Year: A Night for Angus (Shooglenifty at Celtic Connections)
 Folk Band of the Year: Talisk
 Gaelic Singer of the Year:  Robert Robertson
 Instrumentalist of the Year:   Gary Innes
 Live Act of the Year: Skipinnish
 Music Tutor of the Year:  Emma Tomlinson
 Scottish Pipe Band of the Year: Inveraray & District Pipe Band
 Trad Music in the Media: BBC Radio 2 Folk Awards
 Up and Coming Artist of the Year:  Hò-rò
 Venue of the Year:  Tolbooth, Stirling

2016
The awards were staged at Caird Hall, Dundee and broadcast live on BBC Alba.
 Album of the Year:  Astar by Breabach
 Club of the Year:   Stonehaven Folk Club
 Composer of the Year:   Kris Drever
 Community Project of the Year:  Feis Rois Life Long Learning Project
 Event of the Year: Piping Live! Festival, Glasgow 
 Gaelic Singer of the Year:  Ellen MacDonald
 Instrumentalist of the Year: Rachel Newton
 Live Act of the Year: Skerryvore
 Citty Finlayson Scots Singer of the Year:   Lori Watson
 Scottish Dance Band of the Year: Trail West
 Folk Band of the Year: Breabach
 Scottish Pipe Band of the Year:  North Lanarkshire Schools Pipe Band
 Trad Music in the Media:  BBC Radio Scotland's Take the Floor
 Music Tutor of the Year:  Jim Hunter
 Up and Coming Artist of the Year: Ryan Young
 Venue of the Year:  The Glad Café, Glasgow

2015
The awards were staged at Caird Hall, Dundee and broadcast live on BBC Alba.
 Album of the Year: Grind by Treacherous Orchestra
 Club of the Year: Orkney Accordion and Fiddle Club
 Composer of the Year: Ross Ainslie
 Community Project of the Year: Live Music Now Scotland
 Event of the Year: GRIT: Celtic Connections Opening Concert
 Gaelic Singer of the Year: Griogair Labhruidh
 Instrumentalist of the Year: Mairi Campbell
 Live Act of the Year: RURA
 Citty Finlayson Scots Singer of the Year: Fiona Hunter
 Scottish Dance Band of the Year: Simon Howie
 Scottish Folk Band of the Year: Dàimh
 Pipe Band of the Year: Shotts and Dykehead Caledonia Pipe Band
 Trad Music in the Media: Port, BBC Alba
 Music Tutor of the Year: Jenn Butterworth
 Up and Coming Artist of the Year:  League of Highland Gentlemen
 Venue of the Year Award: SEALL at Sabhal Mòr Ostaig

2014
The awards were staged at the Inverness Leisure Centre and broadcast live on BBC Alba.
 Album of the Year: Live at Celtic Connections by Duncan Chisholm
 Club of the Year: Tin Hut Sessions
 Composer of the Year: Jim Sutherland
 Community Project of the Year: Summer Isles Festival
 Event of the Year: GRIT: The Martyn Bennett Story
 Gaelic Singer of the Year: Mischa Macpherson
 Instrumentalist of the Year: Catriona McKay
 Live Act of the Year: Skipinnish
 Citty Finlayson Scots Singer of the Year: Emily Smith
 Scottish Dance Band of the Year: Da Fustra
 Scottish Folk Band of the Year: Julie Fowlis
 Pipe Band of the Year: West Lothian Schools pipe band
 Trad Music in the Media: Isles FM
 Music Tutor of the Year: Douglas Montgomery
 Up and Coming Artist of the Year: The Elephant Sessions
 Venue of the Year Award: The Ceilidh Place

2013
The 2013 ceremony was held in Aberdeen.
 Album of the Year: Room Enough For All by Battlefield Band
 Club of the Year: Folklub
 Composer of the Year: Donald Shaw
 Community Project of the Year: Gizzen Briggs (Tain Royal Academy)
 Event of the Year: Tiree Music Festival
 Gaelic Singer of the Year: Rachel Walker
 Instrumentalist of the Year: Chris Stout (Shetland)
 Live Act of the Year: Breabach
 Citty Finlayson Scots Singer of the Year: Siobhan Miller
 Scottish Dance Band of the Year: Trail West
 Scottish Folk Band of the Year: Blazin' Fiddles
 Pipe Band of the Year: Ullapool and District Junior Pipe Band
 Trad Music in the Media: Travelling Folk, BBC Radio Scotland
 Music Tutor of the Year: Corrina Hewat (Borders)
 Up and Coming Artist of the Year: Robert Robertson
 Venue of the Year Award: National Piping Centre, Glasgow

2012
 Album of the Year: Cille Bhrìde (Kilbride) by Kathleen MacInnes
 Club of the Year: Falkirk Folk Club
 Composer of the Year: Mike Vass
 Community Project of the Year: Feis Rois Local and National Ceilidh Trail 2012
 Event of the Year: Scots Fiddle Festival
 Gaelic Singer of the Year: Riona Whyte
 Instrumentalist of the Year: Duncan Chisholm
 Live Act of the Year: Session A9
 Citty Finlayson Scots Singer of the Year: Paul McKenna
 Scottish Dance Band of the Year: Deoch 'n' Dorus
 Scottish Folk Band of the Year: Breabach
 Pipe Band of the Year: George Watson's College Pipes and Drums
 Trad Music in the Media: Julie Fowlis for Brave
 Music Tutor of the Year: Gillian Frame
 Up and Coming Artist of the Year: Niteworks
 Venue of the Year Award: Bogbain Farm, Inverness

2011
The ceremony was held in the Perth Concert Hall.
 Album of the Year: Mànran by Mànran
 Club of the Year: Leith Folk Club
 Composer of the Year: Aidan O'Rourke
 Community Project of the Year: Blazin' in Beauly
 Event of the Year: Orkney Folk Festival
 Instrumentalist of the Year: Innes Watson
 Live Act of the Year: Skerryvore
 Citty Finlayson Scots Singer of the Year: Siobhan Miller
 Gaelic Singer of the Year: Norrie MacIver
 Scottish Folk Band of the Year: Battlefield Band
 Pipe Band of the Year: Field Marshal Montgomery Pipe Band
 Scottish Dance Band of the Year: Robern Nairn
 Trad Music in the Media Award: Transatlantic Sessions
 Music Tutor of the Year: Mairi Campbell
 Up and Coming Artist of the Year: RURA
 Venue of the Year: Ben Nevis

2010
 Album of the Year: Uam by Julie Fowlis
 Club of the Year: Highland Club (Inverness)
 Composer of the Year: Iain Morrison
 Community Project of the Year: Orkney Traditional Music Project
 Event of the Year: Shetland Folk Festival
 Instrumentalist of the Year: Martin O'Neill
 Live Act of the Year: Red Hot Chilli Pipers
 Citty Finlayson Scots Singer of the Year:  Joe Aitken
 Gaelic Singer of the Year:  Eilidh Mackenzie
 Scottish Folk Band of the Year: Malinky
 Scottish Pipe Band of the Year:  Oban High School Pipe Band
 Scottish Dance Band of the Year:  Ian Muir Scottish Dance Band
 Trad Music in the Media Award:  Travelling Folk, BBC Radio Scotland
 Music Tutor of the Year:  Gordon Connell
 Up and Coming Artist of the Year:  Matheu Watson
 Venue of the Year:  Skipinnish Ceilidh House, Oban

2009
 Album of the Year: All Dressed in Yellow by Fiddlers' Bid
 Club of the Year: Stonehaven Folk Club
 Composer of the Year: Mairearad Green
 Community of the Year: Caledonian Canal Ceilidh Trail
 Event of the Year: Hebridean Celtic Festival
 Instrumentalist of the Year: Lauren MacColl
 Live Act of the Year: Lau
 Citty Finlayson Scots Singer of the Year:  Shona Donaldson
 Gaelic Singer of the Year: Christine Primrose
 Scottish Folk Band of the Year: Bodega
 Scottish Pipe Band of the Year:  Haddington Pipe Band
 Scottish Dance Band of the Year:  Tom Orr Scottish Dance Band
 Trad Music in the Media Award:  The Reel Blend (BBC Radio Scotland)
 Music Tutor of the Year:  Ian Duncan
 Up and Coming Artist of the Year: Paul McKenna Band
 Venue of the Year: The Old Fruit Market Glasgow

2008
 Album of the Year: Farrar by Duncan Chisholm
 Composer of the Year: Blair Douglas
 Live Act of the Year: Peatbog Faeries
 Instrumentalist of the Year: Kris Drever
 Up and Coming Artist of the Year: Jeana Leslie & Siobhan Miller
 Gaelic Singer of the Year: Margaret Stewart
 Club of the Year: The Wee Folk Club, Edinburgh
 Community Project of the Year: Ceolas
 Event of the Year: Piping Live! - Glasgow International Piping Festival
 Services to Industry Award: Arthur Cormack
 Citty Finlayson Scots Singer of the Year: Emily Smith
 Scottish Dance Band of the Year: Skipinnish
 Scottish Folk Band of the Year: The Chair
 Scottish Pipe Band of the Year: ScottishPower Pipe Band
 Strathspey and Reel Society of the Year: Scottish Fiddle Orchestra
 Venue of the Year: Perth Concert Hall

2007
 Album of the Year: Cuilidh by Julie Fowlis
 Composer of the Year: Phil Cunningham
 Live Act of the Year:Red Hot Chilli Pipers
 Instrumentalist of the Year: Catriona McKay
 Up and Coming Artist of the Year: Maeve Mackinnon
 Gaelic Singer of the Year: Julie Fowlis
 Club of the Year: Ceol's Craic, Glasgow
 Community Project of the Year: Scots Music Group
 Event of the Year: The Royal National Mod
 Services to Industry Award: John Purser for Scotland's Music – A Radio History
 Citty Finlayson Scots Singer of the Year: Mairi Campbell
 Scottish Dance Band of the Year: Cullivoe Dance Band
 Scottish Folk Band of the Year: Old Blind Dogs
 Scottish Pipe Band of the Year: The Mid Argyll Pipe Band
 Strathspey and Reel Society of the Year: Fochabers Fiddlers
 Venue of the Year: An Lanntair (Stornoway)

2006
 Album of the Year: Heart of America by Donnie Munro
 Club of the Year: Wick Accordion and Fiddle Club
 Composer of the Year: Donald Shaw 
 Community Project of the Year: Fèisean nan Gàidheal
 Event of the Year: World Pipe Band Championships
 Gaelic Singer of the Year: Kathleen MacInnes
 Instrumentalist of the Year: Aidan O'Rourke
 Live Act of the Year: The McCalmans
 Citty Finlayson Scots Singer of the Year: Sylvia Barnes
 Scottish Dance Band of the Year: Marian Anderson Scottish Dance Band 
 Scottish Folk Band of the Year: Anna Massie Band
 Scottish Pipe Band of the Year: Kintyre Schools Pipe Band 
 Services to Industry Award: Johnny Mowat
 Strathspey and Reel Society of the Year: Banchory Strathspey and Reel Society 
 The McEwan's Sessions Venue of the Year: The Lismore, Glasgow 
 Up and Coming Artist of the Year: Jenna Cumming

2005
 Album of the Year: Magnificent Seven by Blazin' Fiddles
 Club of the Year: Glenfarg Folk Club
 Composer of the Year: Charlie McKerron
 Community Project of the Year: Lochgoilhead Fiddle Workshop
 Event of the Year: Blazin' in Beauly
 Gaelic Singer of the Year: Julie Fowlis
 Instrumentalist of the Year: Aaron Jones
 Live Act of the Year: Peatbog Faeries
 Media Award: Aig Cridhe Ar Ciuil (At the Heart of our Music is Song)
 Scots Singer of the Year: Jim Reid
 Scottish Dance Band of the Year: Gordon Shand and his Scottish Dance Band
 Scottish Folk Band of the Year: Back of the Moon
 Scottish Pipe Band of the Year: The House of Edgar Shotts & Dykehead Pipe Band
 Services to Industry Award: MusicScotland
 The McEwan's Sessions Venue of the Year: Hootananny, Inverness
 Up and Coming Artist of the Year: Jenna Reid

2004
 Album of the Year: Fire & Grace by Alasdair Fraser & Natalie Haas
 BBC Radio Scotland Personality of the Year: Fiona Mackenzie
 Community Project of the Year: Feis Rois Traditional Music in Schools project
 Club of the Year: Hootananny, Inverness
 Event of the Year: Hebridean Celtic Festival
 Gaelic Singer of the Year: Maggie MacInnes
 Instrumentalist of the Year: Fred Morrison
 Journalist of the Year: Sue Wilson
 Live Act of the Year: Blazin' Fiddles
 The Media Award: Take the Floor (BBC Radio Scotland)
 Retailer of the Year: Foot Stompin Celtic Music
 Scots Singer of the Year: Dick Gaughan
 Scottish Dance Band of the Year: Da Fustra
 Folk Band of the Year: Old Blind Dogs
 Pipe Band of the Year: Kirkwall City Pipe Band
 Songwriter of the Year: Jim Malcolm
 Up and Coming Band of the Year: Dòchas

2003
 Best Album: Cliar by Cliar
 Best Scots Singer: Karine Polwart
 Best Gaelic Singer: Karen Matheson
 Best Instrumentalist: Phil Cunningham
 Best Scottish Dance Band: Alasdair MacCuish and the Black Rose Ceilidh Band
 Best Pipeband: ScottishPower Pipe Band
 Best Folk Band: Capercaillie
 Best Festival: Celtic Connections
 Best Club: Shetland Accordion Club
 Best Live Act: Battlefield Band
 Best Up and Coming Artist/Band: Back of the Moon
 Radio/TV Show of the year: Travelling Folk, BBC Radio Scotland
 Retailer of the year: Coda Music
 Media Award: The Living Tradition
 Services to Traditional Music: Hamish Henderson

References

External links
Scots Trad Music Awards web pages
Scots Trad Music Hall of Fame

British music awards
Scottish awards
Scottish music
Folk music awards